The Man in the Sombrero is a 1916 American silent short romantic drama written and directed by Tom Ricketts. The film features Harold Lockwood and May Allison.

Cast
 Harold Lockwood
 May Allison
 William Stowell
 Harry von Meter

External links

1916 films
1916 romantic drama films
American romantic drama films
American silent short films
American black-and-white films
1916 short films
Films directed by Tom Ricketts
1910s American films
Silent romantic drama films
Silent American drama films